Kaliopasi Uluilakepa (born 21 January 1999) is a New Zealand born Fijian rugby union player who plays for the Fijian Drua in Super Rugby. His position is prop.

Reference list

External links
itsrugby.co.uk profile

1999 births
New Zealand rugby union players
Living people
Rugby union props
Wellington rugby union players
Northland rugby union players
Fijian Drua players
Fijian rugby union players